Eustace Hamilton Miles (22 September 1868 – 20 December 1948) was a British real tennis player who competed in the 1908 Summer Olympics, restaurateur, and a diet guru who made his name selling health products and health advice to Edwardian Britons.

Career
Miles was the grandson of Sir William Miles, 1st Baronet by his son Captain William Henry Miles, J.P. (1830–1888) and Mary Frances Miles, née Charleton.  He was born at Hampstead and was educated at Eastbourne College, Marlborough College and King's College, Cambridge.

In 1906, Miles married Dorothy Beatrice Harriet Killick (nicknamed Hallie). In 1908, he won the Olympic Silver Medal at the age of 39, after losing the final to Jay Gould II, the Bronze Medal was won by The Hon Neville Bulwer-Lytton, later 3rd Earl of Lytton.   Miles had, in fact, coached the much younger Gould during his stay in America in 1900–2 when he became the first non-American winner of the US Championship in 1900.   He won further the amateur racquets championship of the world in singles in 1906 and in doubles in 1902, 1904, 1905 and 1906; and of England in doubles as well as becoming amateur squash racquets champion of America in 1900.  He was amateur real tennis champion of England in 1898–1903, 1905, 1906, 1909 and 1911 and amateur real tennis champion of the world in 1898-1903 and 1905.

He was a prolific author, including collaborations with lifelong friend E.F. Benson with whom he may have had a college romance, on diverse subjects including health (e.g. "Fitness for Play and Work" 1912), athletics ("An Alphabet of Athletics"), diet ("The Failures of Vegetarianism" 1902), ancient history ("A History of Rome up to 500 AD, with Essays, Maps and Aids to Memory" 1901) and Classics ("Comparative Syntax of Greek and Latin"). He married Hallie Killick, also an author, and both engaged in philanthropic works including providing free food and clothing to the poor of London, available during winter months near Cleopatra's Needle, a charitable exercise supported strongly by Queen Alexandra.

Health and Diet

Miles advertised and experimented with different fad diets. He originally embraced a uric acid-free diet but found it too restricting. He later criticized this diet in a booklet The Uric Acid Fetish (1915). Miles also experimented with Edward H. Dewey's "No Breakfast Plan" but abandoned it in favour of his own "No Lunch Plan".

Historian Ina Zweiniger-Bargielowska has noted that "Miles's comprehensive regimen combined vegetarianism and abstention from alcohol with games, daily practice of gymnastics, personal cleanliness, breathing exercises, and meditation." Miles promoted the concept of "mental hygiene". Miles authored many books on dieting and vegetarianism.

Miles drew publicity for his article on how to live on a diet of two plasmon biscuits and one lentil a day. In 1904, it was humorously reported in Punch that during the semi-final of a tennis competition, Miles was surrounded by an angry mob who compelled him to eat a meat chop.

Miles was known for promoting different vegetable diets. He became a vegetarian but refused to be identified under that label as he believed the practice of vegetarianism had many faults, he expounded on these ideas in his book The Failures of Vegetarianism. His diet emphasized grains, legumes and meat substitutes which he called "Simpler Food". He published a monthly magazine, Healthward Ho! and was the owner of a vegetarian restaurant in Chandos Street, Charing Cross that was alleged to have served more than a thousand diners a day. His restaurant is briefly mentioned in E. M. Forster's Howards End (1910). He also owned health food shops in London and two other restaurants, in Carshalton and Chelsea. Although he expanded his business and his restaurant prospered during WWI, interest in his dieting ideas declined. Miles later went bankrupt and sold his properties. When he died he left only £175.

Miles has also been described as an advocate of lacto vegetarianism. His ideas about dieting were criticized by medical health experts as impractical. Physician William Tibbles suggested that "it seems almost impossible for any but the wealthy and leisured classes to follow his teachings thoroughly."

Publications

Better Food for Boys (1901)
The Game of Squash (1901)
Avenues to Health (1902)
The Failures of Vegetarianism (1902)
Daily Training (1903) [with Edward Frederic Benson]
Muscle, Brain, and Diet: A Plea for Simpler Foods (1903)
Racquets, Tennis, and Squash (1903)
A Boy's Control and Self-Expression (1904)
An Alphabet of Athletics (1904)
Breathing for Health, Athletics, and Brain-Work (1904)
Cassell's Physical Educator (1904)
Diversions Day By Day [with Edward Frederic Benson] (1905)
What Foods Feed Us (1905)
The New Cookery of Unproprietary Foods (1906)
Life After Life: The Theory of Reincarnation (1907)
The Eustace Miles System of Physical Culture With Hints as to Diet (1907)
The Training of the Body (1908)
The Power of Concentration: How to Acquire It (1909)
Fitness for Play and Work (1912)
Prevention and Cure (1912)
The Uric Acid Fetish (1915) [with C. H. Collings]
Self-Health as a Habit (1919)
Keep Happy (1920)

References

Further reading

Hallie Eustace Miles. (1930). Untold Tales of War-Time London: A Personal Diary. Cecil Palmer.

External links
 Eustace Miles' profile at databaseOlympics
 Charity
 Eustace Miles' profile at Sports Reference.com

1868 births
1948 deaths
English real tennis players
Jeu de paume players at the 1908 Summer Olympics
Medalists at the 1908 Summer Olympics
Olympic real tennis players of Great Britain
Olympic silver medallists for Great Britain
Pseudoscientific diet advocates
Vegetarianism activists